George Evans Moule  (January 28, 1828, Gillingham, Dorset – March 3, 1912, Auckland Castle) was an Anglican missionary in China and the first Anglican bishop of mid-China.

Biography 
He was the second of eight sons of Henry Moule, an inventor and the vicar of Fordington, Dorset and his wife Mary Mullett Moule née Evans. He graduated from Corpus Christi College, Cambridge in 1850. He was made a Doctor of Divinity in 1880 and in 1905 was made an honorary Fellow of the college. In 1857 he was accepted by the Church Missionary Society and arrived in Ningpo in 1858. In 1861 he was joined there by his brother Arthur Evans Moule. They survived the Taiping Rebellion, and in 1864 he began missionary work in Hangchow (Hangzhou), remaining there until 1874. In 1880 he was made Bishop of Mid-China, with the seat of the diocese at Hangchow. He was known to develop Chekiang (Zhejiang) into a strong diocese. He resigned as bishop in 1907, and returned to England in 1911, to die the next year at the residence of his younger brother Handley Moule, the Bishop of Durham.

Family
Moule and his wife Adelaide had seven children, four of whom (George Moule, C. F. Moule, Henry W. Moule, and Arthur C. Moule) survived him. Their daughter Adelaide Mary Moule (1859-1901) also worked as a missionary in China, as did their sons Henry and Arthur and another daughter, Jane F. Moule. Arthur C. Moule (1873-1957) became a noted sinologist, serving as Professor of Chinese at Cambridge 1933–1938.

References

External links
 a short bio of Moule, with pictures

Alumni of Corpus Christi College, Cambridge
Fellows of Corpus Christi College, Cambridge
English Anglican missionaries
British expatriates in China
1828 births
1912 deaths
19th-century Anglican bishops in China
20th-century Anglican bishops in China
Anglican missionary bishops in China
Anglican bishops of Chekiang